Anna Reid (born 1965) is an English journalist and author whose work focuses primarily on the history of Eastern Europe.

Early life
Reid read law at Oxford University and studied Russian History at the University College London School of Slavonic and East European Studies.  After working as a consultant and business journalist, she moved to Kiev, where she acted as the Ukraine correspondent for the Economist from 1993 to 1995. From 2003 to 2007 she worked for the British think-tank Policy Exchange, editing several of their publications and running the foreign affairs programme.

Works
Reid has published three books on East European history: Borderland: a journey through the history of Ukraine, The Shaman's Coat: A Native History of Siberia, and Leningrad: The Epic Siege of World War II: 1941-1944. Critics have praised her for her highly descriptive narratives of the locations she studies. She has received especially high praise for Leningrad, which is the first 21st century book-length account of the Siege of Leningrad (modern-day Saint Petersburg) by the Germans from 1941 to 1944. In its use of newly discovered primary sources from the Siege, including private diaries of ordinary citizens who suffered from cold and starvation during the winter of 1941-1942, the book has been called "a relentless chronicle of suffering."

Selected bibliography

References

Living people
The Economist people
Historians of Eastern Europe
1965 births
Alumni of the University of Oxford
Alumni of the UCL School of Slavonic and East European Studies